Bosnia and Herzegovina competed at the 2012 Summer Paralympics in London, United Kingdom, from 29 August to 9 September 2012.

Medallists

Athletics 

Women's field events

Volleyball

Men's tournament
Roster

Group B

Quarter-final

Semi-final

Gold medal match

See also

 Bosnia and Herzegovina at the 2012 Summer Olympics

References

Nations at the 2012 Summer Paralympics
2012
2012 in Bosnia and Herzegovina sport